Martinus Johannes (Jan) van Druten (Nijmegen, 4 April 1916 – Amsterdam, 18 July 1993) was a Dutch painter, sculptor and ceramist.

Life and work 
Van Druten was initially cafe owner in Nijmegen. He studied, with some interruptions, between 1939 and 1949 at the Rijksacademie in Amsterdam and devoted himself to painting. According to the Netherlands Institute for Art History in 1946 he won the Prix de Rome. He was a member of the Algemeen Kristelijk Kunstenaarsverbond (General Catholic artists association).

Van Druten bought in 1963 a condemned house in Schellinkhout, which he renovated into a house and workshop. In 1965 he switched to sculpture. His images were collected after his death and on loan to the municipality Venhuizen.

Works (selection) 
 1964 Calf, Oosterblokker
 1967 Scheepsjongens van Bontekoe, Hoorn
 1970 Het Ros Beiaard, Nijmegen
 1970 Methuselah " Wervershoof
 1975 tile decorations gymnasium, Beethovensingel, Alkmaar
 1976? facade ceramics school, Vondelstraat, Alkmaar
 1976 The buck, Oudega [5]
 1978 Soudaens Suspicion Recognize Wervershoof

See also 
 List of Dutch ceramists
 List of Dutch sculptors

References

External links 

1916 births
1993 deaths
Dutch ceramists
Dutch sculptors
Dutch male sculptors
People from Nijmegen
20th-century ceramists